CO2 is the molecular formula for carbon dioxide.

,  or C02 may also refer to:

Arts and entertainment
 CO2 (album), a music album by Stahlmann
 CO2 (opera), an Italian opera by Giorgio Battistelli
 CO2 (film), a 2018 Burmese film

Places
 Grand Geneva Resort Airport (FAA LID code)
 , a postcode district in the CO postcode area, England

Science and technology
 , a mathematical group
 Malignant neoplasm of other and unspecified parts of tongue (ICD-10 code); See Oral cancer